The Mothers of Gynecology Movement sprang out of criticism of 19th century gynecologist J. Marion Sims' experimental surgeries on enslaved women who were unable to consent to their surgeries. Their surgeries were often performed without anesthesia. His work has been described in the late 20th century as an example of racism in the medical profession. Though Sims had many patients, there are only three known patients of his: Anarcha Westcott, and two lesser known women, Lucy and Betsey, which have been described as the "mothers of gynecology" in the United States, to demonstrate the contributions of their experiences to modern medicine.

Terri Kapsalis writes in Mastering the Female Pelvis, "Sims' fame and wealth are as indebted to slavery and racism as they are to innovation, insight, and persistence, and he has left behind a frightening legacy of medical attitudes toward and treatments of women, particularly women of color."

In 2017, NYC Mayor Bill de Blasio launched a commission to evaluate a statue of J. Marion Sims in Central Park. During the 90 day evaluation period, author J.C. Hallman's essay about the Sims monument, "Monumental Error," appeared on the cover of Harper's Magazine, and was published during the time the Public Design Commission held public forums for the evaluation of these monuments. The piece contributed to the greater, nationwide debate about the role of Confederate monuments. The article was distributed to the entire commission. The Sims statue was voted out by unanimous decision and removed in April 2018.

In March 2021, artist Michelle Browder held an event in Los Angeles where she asked the public to bring discarded metal objects so they could be melted down in order to create a monument to the mothers of gynecology. The monument is currently being completed in San Francisco. Sims reported in his own medical literature that Anarcha was 17 and pregnant when he completed the first of 30 total surgeries on her; Lucy spent three months in recovery from a surgery of his. Browder said to the San Francisco Chronicle: "If you’ve ever had a Pap smear, you have Anarcha, Lucy and Betsey to thank." The monument will be erected in Montgomery, Alabama. "Discarded objects represent how Black women have been treated in this country," Browder said to the Los Angeles Times. "But it also represents the beauty that's in the broken and the discarded."

See also 
 Anarcha Westcott
 J. Marion Sims
 Mothers of Gynecology Monument

References

External links 
 https://www.anarchalucybetsey.org/

19th-century American physicians
American gynecologists
American proslavery activists
Slavery in the United States
American surgeons
History of medicine in the United States
History of Montgomery, Alabama
Human subject research in the United States
Medical scandals in the United States
Black Lives Matter
J. Marion Sims